This is a list of public art in Metro Manila organized by city and municipality.

This list applies only to works of public art accessible in an outdoor public space. For example, this does not include artwork visible inside a museum.

Note that the Philippine copyright law does not provide freedom of panorama for copyrighted public art, and therefore several images may be missing from this list.

City of Manila

Caloocan

Makati

Quezon City

San Juan

References

Manila
 
Public art